Ali Baba Goes to Town is a 1937 musical film directed by David Butler and starring Eddie Cantor, Tony Martin, and Roland Young.  Cantor plays a hobo named Aloysius "Al" Babson, who walks into the camp of a movie company that is making the Arabian Nights. He falls asleep and dreams he is in Baghdad as an advisor to the Sultan (Young).  He organizes work programs, taxes the rich, and abolishes the army, in a spoof of Roosevelt's New Deal.

The cast also includes Gypsy Rose Lee, using the stage name of Louise Hovick, as the Sultana.
The Raymond Scott Quintette also appears, performing "Twilight In Turkey."

Two men were killed and two injured on August 27, 1937, when the flying carpet rig collapsed in the studio. The "carpet" was a  platform suspended high above the floor by piano wires attached to the four corners. The platform fell while it was being tested; none of the actors were on set. Three workmen had been riding on the carpet, with one, camera grip Harry Harsha, dying from his injuries the next day, and 48-year-old actor and prop man Philo Goodfriend was crushed to death underneath. Goodfriend had also been the commodore of Santa Monica Yacht Club.

Cast
Eddie Cantor ...  Ali Baba/Aloysius 'Al' Babson
Tony Martin ...  Yusuf/Announcer at Premiere
Roland Young ...  Sultan
June Lang ...  Princess Miriam
Gypsy Rose Lee ...  Sultana 
Raymond Scott ...  Orchestra Leader
John Carradine ...  Ishak/Broderick
Virginia Field ...  Dinah
Alan Dinehart ...  Boland
Douglass Dumbrille ...  Prince Musah
Maurice Cass ...  Omar, The Rug Maker
Warren Hymer ...  Tramp
Stanley Fields ...  Tramp
Paul Hurst...  Captain
Sam Hayes ...  Radio Announcer/Assistant Director
Charles Lane ... Doctor
Jeni Le Gon ... Specialty Dancer
The Peters Sisters ... Specialty Act
The Pearl Twins ... Specialty Dancers
Uncredited Guests At Premiere:
Phyllis Brooks ... Herself
Dolores del Río ... Herself
Douglas Fairbanks ... Himself
Jack Haley ... Himself
Sonja Henie ... Herself
Victor McLaglen ... Himself
Tyrone Power ... Himself
The Ritz Brothers ... Themselves
Cesar Romero ... Himself
Ann Sothern ... Herself
Shirley Temple ...  Herself

Cultural references 
A clip from Ali Baba Goes to Town is shown in the film The Day of the Locust (1975), in which Karen Black plays an aspiring actress in 1930s Hollywood. A brief shot of Black is edited into the Ali Baba footage to create the impression that her character played a bit role in that film.

Some scenes from Ali Baba Goes to Town are described in detail in Swing Time by Zadie Smith. The character Tracey resembles the dancer Jeni LeGon, who performs in the film.

See also
 List of American films of 1937

References

External links

1937 films
1937 musical films
American black-and-white films
Films directed by David Butler
Films set in Baghdad
20th Century Fox films
American musical films
1930s English-language films
1930s American films